Viktor Šnajder (17 June 1934 – 28 November 2014) was a Croatian sprinter who competed for SFR Yugoslavia in the 1960 Summer Olympics.

Šnajder was born in Đakovo and moved to Zagreb in 1957. He obtained a Ph.D. and was a full professor at the Faculty of Kinesiology, University of Zagreb.

References

1934 births
2014 deaths
Croatian male sprinters
Yugoslav male sprinters
Olympic athletes of Yugoslavia
Athletes (track and field) at the 1960 Summer Olympics
Academic staff of the University of Zagreb
Sportspeople from Đakovo
Universiade medalists in athletics (track and field)
Mediterranean Games gold medalists for Yugoslavia
Mediterranean Games medalists in athletics
Athletes (track and field) at the 1959 Mediterranean Games
Universiade gold medalists for Yugoslavia
Medalists at the 1959 Summer Universiade